Oreonectes furcocaudalis is an oligotrobic species of stone loach. This cavefish is found only in Guangxi in China. It grows to  standard length.

References

furcocaudalis
Freshwater fish of China
Endemic fauna of Guangxi
Cave fish
Fish described in 1987